Lawrance A. Bohm (born July 4, 1972) is an American lawyer who is most noted for winning what is believed to be the two largest single-plaintiff employment verdicts in United States history: $185,872,719.52 in Juarez v. AutoZone Stores, Inc. (2014, United States District Court, Southern District of California) and $167,730,488.00 in Chopourian v. Catholic Healthcare West (2012, United States District Court, Eastern District of California). Bohm has won several other large verdicts protecting and defending civil and workplace rights. Bohm has represented clients in several high-profile cases.

Education 
Bohm grew up on Long Island, New York and graduated high school in 1990. Bohm received a B.S. degree in crime, law, and society from the University of California, Irvine, in 1995. Bohm graduated from Tulane University Law School, cum laude in 2000 and externed with United States District Court for the Eastern District of Louisiana Judge Ivan L.R. Lemelle. Bohm was president of his law school class and editor of the Tulane University Law School newspaper.

Career 
In 2000, Bohm began his legal career as an associate attorney at the law offices of Porter, Scott, Weiberg and Delehant in Sacramento, California litigating personal injury, civil rights, and employment claims. In 2003, Bohm began working for Jackson Lewis P.C., a national employment defense firm litigating employment law cases, including claims asserted under the California Fair Employment and Housing Act and Title VII.

In 2005, Bohm established the Bohm Law Group to pursue trial litigation with a focus on labor and employment disputes. Since 2005, Bohm has assisted workers in a variety of workplace disputes, including: wrongful termination, harassment, discrimination, retaliation, whistleblower protection, disability accommodation, severance negotiation, breach of contract, wage and hour disputes and more. Bohm also represents clients in catastrophic injury, wrongful death, medical malpractice and other personal injury matters, including elder abuse and neglect.

Important verdicts 
In November 2014, Bohm obtained a $185,872,719.52 verdict in Juarez v. AutoZone (2014, United States District Court, Southern District of California). This case is now believed to be the largest single-plaintiff employment verdict in United States history.
 Rosario Juarez began her employment with AutoZone in 2000. Juarez was finally promoted to store manager in 2004 after making discrimination complaints. After learning of Juarez’s pregnancy, AutoZone discriminated against her by assigning her unnecessary, time-consuming work and repeatedly ordering her to redo work for no reason. Juarez's supervisor yelled at her and humiliated her in front of employees and customers. Even after Juarez beat all sales targets set by the company, AutoZone nonetheless demoted her. After Juarez challenged her demotion in a lawsuit, AutoZone illegally retaliated by firing her.

In July 2012, Bohm obtained a verdict of $6,241,655 in Webb v. Ramos Oil, Co. (2012, Yolo County Superior Court).  Plaintiff, a tanker truck driver for Ramos Oil was terminated from his employment for refusing to drive in a ferocious storm while intoxicated. Amid power outages and downed phone lines, Webb called dispatch twice worried about the severity of the weather and was told to continue driving. After his shift, Webb went to Bob's Bar in Elk Grove and began drinking. Ramos Oil called Webb multiple times, demanding that he return to work and continue driving, but Webb refused and was fired the next Monday.

In February 2012, Bohm obtained a verdict of $167,730,488.00 in Chopourian v. Catholic Healthcare West (2012, United States District Court, Eastern District of California).  At the time, this case was believed to be the largest single-plaintiff employment verdict in United States history, now surpassed by Bohm’s 2014 verdict in Juarez v. AutoZone. Plaintiff, Ani Chopourian, was terminated from her position as a surgical physician assistant in the cardiovascular surgery unit of Mercy General Hospital, a Sacramento hospital owned and operated by Catholic Healthcare West. During her employment, Chopourian was subjected to daily unwanted sexual advances, physical contact, and inappropriate and demeaning sexual comments. Chopourian was also denied meal and rest breaks required by California law. After Chopourian made several written and verbal complaints to hospital officials regarding these violations and inappropriate patient care, including surgical errors, she became the subject of unwarranted disciplinary actions in retaliation, culminating in her termination.

In April 2010, Bohm obtained a personal injury verdict of $2,185,000 in Lang v. Geweke Motors, Inc. (2010, San Joaquin County Superior Court). The Plaintiff’s low back was injured when his Suburban SUV was hit from behind by a Honda Civic. Neither vehicle required more than minimal repairs. Plaintiff received a two level fusion within a year of the collision. This was Verdict Search’s verdict of the week in June 2010. Bohm set a second place mark in California for achieving three verdicts over one million dollars in a single year.

In February 2010, Bohm obtained a verdict of $1,500,000 in Cosby v. AutoZone (2010, United States District Court, Eastern District of California). Plaintiff, another AutoZone District Manager alleging failure to accommodate his sleep apnea condition. Although the jury found a basis for punitive damages, no additional monetary damages were awarded. The jury’s verdict included $1.3 million for emotional distress. On appeal, the United States Court of Appeals for the Ninth Circuit ordered the case remanded back to the district court for remittitur regarding the issue of both economic and non-economic damages with the option of a new trial on damages.

In January 2010, Bohm obtained a verdict of $1,368,675 in Kell v. Autozone (2010, Sacramento County Superior Court). Plaintiff, an AutoZone District Manager was terminated in retaliation for reporting unlawful harassment and discrimination by the company’s human resources manager. Defendants’ Motion for New Trial was denied even though Plaintiff received punitive damages in the maximum amount allowed by law. The court awarded an additional $780,000 in attorney’s fees and costs. In February 2014, the California Third District Court of Appeal reduced the amount of punitive damages, but otherwise affirmed the judgment. This was Verdict Search’s verdict of the month for May 2010.

In 2007, Bohm obtained a $2,025,000 personal injury verdict in Ieremia v. Hilmar Unified School District (2007, San Joaquin County Superior Court). Plaintiff, a working mother of five was ejected during a roll-over accident resulting in painful scarring on her left side and face. The case was appealed and resulted in a published opinion affirming the verdict and clarifying the law concerning recovery for uninsured plaintiffs. Ieremia v. Hilmar Unified School District, 166 Cal.App.4th 324 (2008).

Awards and honors 
Bohm is a lifetime member of the Million Dollar Advocates Forum and Multi-Million Dollar Advocates Forum. In 2010, Bohm was selected as one of the Daily Journal's Top Labor and Employment Lawyers in California. In 2012, Bohm was selected as one of the Daily Journal's Top 100 Lawyers in California. Also in 2012, Bohm was selected by the Capital City Trial Lawyers Association as Advocate of the Year. Bohm was also ranked #1 on eBossWatch 2012 list of the Nation's Top Employment Lawyers. In 2013, Bohm was spotlighted in Sacramento Business Journal's 2013 Best of the Bar special edition. In 2014, Bohm was named a Super Lawyer.

Speaking engagements
Bohm is a weekly contributor and legal analyst to the David Cruz Show on The Patriot, AM 1150 KEIB radio program. Bohm regularly appears on numerous other radio and television broadcasts. Bohm is also a regular lecturer at legal conferences  and is an adjunct professor of law at Tulane University Law School.

Personal life
Bohm is married to Elisa (Williams) and has three children. Bohm resides in Sacramento, California.

References

1972 births
Living people
Tulane University Law School alumni